The Taipei Representative Office in the Netherlands; represents the interests of Taiwan in the Netherlands in the absence of formal diplomatic relations, functioning as a de facto embassy. Its counterpart in Taiwan is the Netherlands Office Taipei in Taipei.
 
It was established as the Far East Trade Office in 1979.
The Office is headed by a Representative, currently Hsing Hsing Chen.

Dutch Caribbean
While the Taipei Representative Office in the Netherlands has responsibility for the European Netherlands, the Embassies of the Republic of China in Saint Kitts and Nevis and Saint Vincent and the Grenadines have responsibility for the countries and special municipalities of the Dutch Caribbean.

Representatives
 Nelson Ku (1997-2000)
 Katharine Chang (2003-2006)
 Larry Wang (2006-2008)
  (2019-)

See also
 List of diplomatic missions of Taiwan
 List of diplomatic missions in the Netherlands

References

External links

 Taipei Representative Office in the Netherlands

 

Netherlands
Taiwan
1979 establishments in the Netherlands
Diplomatic missions in The Hague
Organizations established in 1979
Foreign trade of the Netherlands
Netherlands–Taiwan relations
20th-century architecture in the Netherlands